Tick Tock Tuckered is a 1944 Warner Bros. Looney Tunes cartoon directed by Bob Clampett. The cartoon was released on April 8, 1944, and stars Porky Pig and Daffy Duck. This is a color remake of the cartoon Porky's Badtime Story (1937), with Daffy filling the role that was previously played by Gabby Goat. A gag from Friz Freleng’s  cartoon Notes to You (1941) was also reused as well, while a reference to The Dover Boys (1942) is briefly made.

Plot
The plot is largely the same as the plot of Porky's Badtime Story.

When Porky Pig and Daffy Duck realize that they overslept to 10 a.m. after their alarm goes off at 6 a.m., they end up rushing to work at the Fly-By-Nite Aircraft Company and sneaking in. When it came to clocking in, Daffy winds the clock backwards two hours and clocks in, only for the alarm to go off. Their boss (a caricature of Clampett's immediate boss, production manager Ray Katz) catches them and in a cheerful manner, states that if they were not going to make it, he would have sent their work to them. He then drops his friendly façade and angrily warns them that if they are late again they will be terminated. He then orders them to get to work, to which they dash into their office and close the door so fast that the sign on the door shatters.

Later that night at 8 p.m., Porky sets the alarm clock as Daffy complains about having to go to bed so early, but Porky reminds Daffy about their boss' threat to fire them if they are late again. Porky climbs into bed and they both fall asleep until a bunch of cats and dogs next door wake them up. Later that night, the moon comes out and its light wakes up Porky. One of Porky's attempts to close the blind ends up wrecking his bed. This also disturbs Daffy who ends up grabbing a shotgun and shooting the moon, which then falls from the sky as a result. ("Unbelievable, isn't it?") As the night progresses, a thunderstorm occurs while Porky is sleeping in Daffy's bed. Porky closes the window only for a leak in the roof to disturb him and Daffy. Daffy opens an umbrella in the house with Porky warning him that it is bad luck. Daffy ignores Porky's statement until lightning destroys the umbrella. When Daffy shouts that he should "try sleeping under Niagara Falls", a torrent of water comes through the roof and rains down on them.

The next morning, Porky and Daffy are sleeping in the drawers when the alarm clock goes off at 6 a.m. They get themselves ready and drive to work to make sure they get there on time. When they arrive, a sign on the door reads "Closed Sunday". Porky states that they do not have to work today, to which Daffy boxes himself ("Now he tells me!") before they drive home. When they climb back into the drawers to sleep, the alarm clock goes off again at 6:15. Porky shoots the alarm clock, which falls over and dies.

Home media
 VHS-Porky Pig and Daffy Duck Cartoon Festival Starring "Tick Tock Tuckered"
 VHS-Just Plain Daffy
 VHS-Looney Tunes Collectors Edition: Porky and Daffy
 Laserdisc-Golden Age of Looney Tunes Vol 2
 DVD-Looney Tunes Super Stars' Daffy Duck: Frustrated Fowl

References

External links
 

Looney Tunes shorts
1944 films
1944 animated films
Short film remakes
Daffy Duck films
Porky Pig films
Films scored by Carl Stalling
Films directed by Bob Clampett
Films produced by Leon Schlesinger
1940s Warner Bros. animated short films
Warner Bros. Cartoons animated short films